This is a list of football games played by the South Korea national football team between 2010 and 2019.

Results by year

List of matches

2010

2011

2012

2013

2014

2015

2016

2017

2018

2019

See also
 South Korea national football team results
 South Korea national football team

References

External links

2010s in South Korean sport
2010